The Howell House is a historic house in the Germantown section of Philadelphia, Pennsylvania. The three-story stone house was built in 1795 by William Forbes.

It was listed on the National Register of Historic Places in 1972. It is a contributing property of the Colonial Germantown Historic District.

References

External links
Listing and photographs at the Historic American Buildings Survey

Federal architecture in Pennsylvania
Houses completed in 1795
Houses on the National Register of Historic Places in Philadelphia
Historic district contributing properties in Pennsylvania
Germantown, Philadelphia